Şahverdi can refer to:

 Şahverdi Çetin
 Şahverdi, Hınıs
 Şahverdi, Refahiye